Peter M. Barbolak (April 1, 1926October 22, 2006) was a professional American football offensive tackle in the National Football League.

He is the father of comedian Vicki Barbolak, a contestant on season 13 of America's Got Talent who finished in the top 10.

References

Players of American football from Chicago
American football offensive tackles
Pittsburgh Steelers players
Purdue Boilermakers football players
Purdue University alumni
1926 births
2006 deaths